Poyntonophrynus kavangensis is a species of toad in the family Bufonidae. It is found in Angola, Botswana, Namibia, Zimbabwe, and presumably Zambia.
Its natural habitats are sandy areas of grasslands.  It is associated with ephemeral pools and pans. It can breed in hypersaline pans.

References

kavangensis
Frogs of Africa
Amphibians of Angola
Amphibians of Botswana
Amphibians of Namibia
Amphibians of Zimbabwe
Amphibians described in 1988
Taxonomy articles created by Polbot